Ekaterina Vladimirovna Litvnova (née Chernova; born 18 January 1994) is a Russian female handball player for Dinamo Volgograd and the Russian national team.

She also represented Russia in the 2011 European Women's Youth Handball Championship and in the 2014 Women's Junior World Handball Championship, were she received gold and silver.

Achievements
Russian Super League
Gold Medalist: 2012, 2013, 2014
EHF Champions League:
Fourth place: 2014/15
World Junior Championship:
Silver Medalist: 2014
European Junior Championship:
Gold Medalist: 2013
World Youth Championship:
Silver Medalist: 2012
European Youth Championship:
Gold Medalist: 2011

Individual awards 
 All-Star Left wing of the Junior World Championship: 2012
 All-Star Left wing of the European Junior Championship: 2013

References

Weblinks 
 Profil of the Russian Handball Federation
 Profile on Dinamo Volgograd

1994 births
Living people
Russian female handball players
People from Tolyatti